National Route 56 is a national highway of Japan connecting Kōchi, Kōchi and Matsuyama, Ehime.

Route data
Length: 300.2 km (186.54 mi).

References

056
Roads in Ehime Prefecture
Roads in Kōchi Prefecture